Dr. Swaroop Rawal (née Sampat; born 3 November 1958) is an Indian actress who has acted in several Hindi language films such as Naram Garam and Nakhuda and is known for her performance in television serials like Yeh Jo Hai Zindagi. She won the Miss India contest in 1979 and represented India at Miss Universe 1979.

Early life

Swaroop obtained a PhD. in Education from the University of Worcester. She did her doctoral thesis on using drama to enhance life skills in children with learning disabilities.

Acting career
Swaroop Sampat became successful with the hugely popular TV comedy show Yeh Jo Hai Zindagi, where she played the role of Shafi Inamdar's wife. She had reportedly rejected another important serial on television at that time because she found the script of Yeh Jo Hai Zindagi very touching and was sure that it connected well with common people and showed their day-to-day activities and living with simplicity. It is a decision she is happy about as the serial turned out to be an all-time hit. She  also appeared in the Kamal Haasan-Reena Roy starrer Karishma.

Swaroop modeled for Shringar, a kumkum company. She teaches acting to disabled children.

Other pursuits
She is a trainer, travelling across India to conduct workshops for teachers to impart this knowledge for the benefit of children.

She was selected by the then Gujarat Chief Minister Narendra Modi to head an educational program for children.

She was selected as one of the top 10 Global finalists for the Global Teacher Prize conducted by Varkey Foundation, amongst 10,000 nominations from 179 countries worldwide.

Personal life
Swaroop is married to actor Paresh Rawal. She directs and acts in plays starring her husband. They have two sons, Aniruddh and Aditya.

Filmography

Television

References

External links

I wasn't an actress to begin with: Swaroop Sampat interview at Hindustan Times

1958 births
20th-century Indian actresses
21st-century Indian actresses
Actresses in Hindi cinema
Alumni of the University of Worcester
Femina Miss India winners
Indian film actresses
Living people
Miss Universe 1979 contestants
Female models from Mumbai